This is a list of monuments in Gudja, Malta, which are listed on the National Inventory of the Cultural Property of the Maltese Islands.

List 

|}

References

External links
Niches and statues in Gudja

Gudja
Gudja